Barátka is the Hungarian name for two communes in Romania:

 Bratca Commune, Bihor County
 Baratca village, Bârgăuani Commune, Neamţ County